The 1971–72 season saw Tottenham Hotspur compete in the First Division where they finished 6th in the table. It was also the season where they won the UEFA Cup for the first time beating Wolverhampton Wanderers in an all English final over two legs. In the FA Cup they reach the sixth round where they went away to Leeds United at Elland Road to lose 2–1. In the League Cup they reached the Semi–final where they were knocked out by Chelsea.

Squad

Transfers

Out

Competitions

First Division

League Cup

FA Cup

UEFA Cup

References

Tottenham Hotspur F.C. seasons
English football clubs 1971–72 season
UEFA Europa League-winning seasons